To Demonstrate How Spiders Fly is a 1909 British short  silent animated documentary film, directed by F. Percy Smith, featuring a close-up of an animated model spider throwing its silken thread to take to the air. The film features "the first of several animated creatures to appear in Smith's films", and according to Jenny Hammerton of BFI Screenonline was made in the belief, "that he could cure people of their fear of spiders by showing them blown up images of their eight legged foes on the cinema screen."

References

1909 animated films
1909 films
British black-and-white films
British silent short films
1900s short documentary films
Black-and-white documentary films
Films about spiders
Stop-motion animated short films
British short documentary films
1900s animated short films